Ferryhill Athletic Football Club is an English association football club which has formerly participated in the Northern League from 1923 to 1997 and also in the Wearside League from 1998 to 2006. They reached the FA Cup First Round Proper on two occasions, losing 6–1 to Oldham Athletic in the 1935–36 season, and 3–0 to Workington in the 1953–54 season.

In the 2021-22 season, Ferryhill Athletic (previously Durham FC) were reformed in the Wearside League Division 2 in a bid to bring back football to the town and currently play at Dean Bank Recreation Centre. Plans to regain Northern League status has been backed by the Ferryhill Mmyor with plans to install an artificial pitch to play home games on.

Honours
Northern League
Champions: 1937–38, 1947–48, 1957–58
Runners-up: 1923–24

Website

Ferryhill Athletic

See also
:Category:Ferryhill Athletic F.C. players

References

1923 establishments in England
2006 disestablishments in England
Association football clubs established in 1923
Defunct football clubs in England
Association football clubs disestablished in 2006
Ferryhill
Defunct football clubs in Tyne and Wear